Pony.ai is an autonomous vehicle technology company co-located in Silicon Valley, Beijing, and Guangzhou.

History 
The company was founded in December 2016 by James Peng and Tiancheng Lou who were formerly developers for Baidu in Silicon Valley.

In April 2019, Pony.ai launched a pilot system covering  in Guangzhou for employees and invited affiliates, serving pre-defined pick-up points.

In November 2019, the company started a three-month trial in Irvine, California, with 10 cars and defined stops for pick-up and drop-off.

In May 2021, California regulator, California Department of Motor Vehicles (DMV), gave Pony.ai permission to test six autonomous vehicles without human safety drivers on specified streets in Fremont, Milpitas and Irvine. The permit restricts operation to roads with speed limits not exceeding  in clear weather and light precipitation. Testing was planned to start in Fremont and Milpitas on weekdays between 10 a.m. and 3 p.m. In June 2021, testing began in Fremont and Milpitas.

On October 28, a Pony.ai vehicle operating in autonomous mode hit a road center divider and a traffic sign in Fremont after turning right. In December 2021, California DMV suspended a driverless testing permit for Pony.ai following this accident. It is the first time for DMV to issue such a suspension. Subsequently, the National Highway Traffic Safety Administration (NHTSA) launched a probe.
More than four months after the accident, the NHTSA announced the "first recall of an automated driving system" as the company complied with the government agency’s request.
In May 2022, California DMV revoked Pony.ai's permit for failing to monitor the driving records of the safety drivers on its testing permit.

According to California DMV, in 2021 Pony.ai came third place in number of miles driven and was behind Waymo and Cruise.

In April 2022, Pony.ai became the first autonomous driving company to get a taxi license in China.

Financing
In January 2018 Pony.ai completed a $112 million Series A round co-led by Morningside Venture Capital and Legend Capital with seed round lead-investor Sequoia China and investor IDG Capital also participating in the round, alongside Hongtai Capital, Legend Star, Puhua Capital, Polaris Capital, DCM Ventures, Comcast Ventures and Silicon Valley Future Capital.

In February 2020, Toyota invested $400 million in the company as part of a funding round of $462 million. Toyota previously announced working with Pony.ai on testing self-driving cars on public roads in Beijing and Shanghai.

The company intended to go public on the New York Stock Exchange via a SPAC route but in 2021, suspended its plans due to the China regulators.

As of 2020, the company had a valuation of $5.3 billion.

See also
List of unicorn startup companies
Robotaxi
Apolong

References

External links
 

Self-driving car companies
Technology companies established in 2016